Bogen Glacier is a small glacier on the north side of Drygalski Fjord between Trendall Crag and Hamilton Bay, at the southeast end of South Georgia. It was named by the UK Antarctic Place-Names Committee in 1979 after Arne Bogen, Norwegian sealer working in South Georgia after 1950; Master of the sealing vessel Albatross and Station Foreman, Grytviken.

See also
 List of glaciers in the Antarctic
 Glaciology
 Retreat of glaciers since 1850
 Glacier mass balance

References

External links
 

Glaciers of South Georgia